State Highway 164 runs in Coimbatore District of Tamil Nadu, India. It connects Coimbatore with Anaikatti. It passes through Thadagam road.

Junctions  

The highway meets the following arterial roads along the way:
 National Highway 181 at Goundampalayam
 State Highway 167 at KNG pirivu

State highways in Tamil Nadu